The 2008 Great Alaska Shootout was held from November 26, 2008, through November 29, 2008.

Men's
* – Denotes overtime period

Bracket

Women's

References

Great Alaska Shootout
Great Alaska Shootout
Great Alaska Shootout
Great Alaska Shootout
Great Alaska Shootout